Church Leader Insights (CLI) is an organization, founded by Nelson Searcy, that provides training and resources to pastors and church leaders. A pioneer in using the internet to equip pastors, Searcy's CLI Newsletter (formerly known as Evangelism Online) is distributed to more than 46,000 pastors each month.  To date, CLI has trained more than a thousand church leaders—of all sizes, denominations, and backgrounds—through its seminars.

Free stuff for church planters
Citing leading church growth writer C. Peter Wagner's famous observation that church planting is the most effective evangelistic strategy under heaven, CLI has a standing offer to give free resources to church planters who visit their website.

Newsletter
The CLI Newsletter began back in 1995, as Evangelism Online.  Regular distribution of resources and training materials to church leaders has been around since the early church.  However, Searcy's use of e-mail as the delivery mechanism was innovative and well-received, as evidenced by his 46,000 person subscriber list by 2008.

While its purpose is the same—to equip pastors and church leaders—the current CLI Newsletter has expanded beyond the topic of evangelism.  Today's CLI Newsletter is a free, bi-weekly email publication that focuses on effective church leadership, church growth, church planting, and evangelism.  It is currently distributed to more than 46,000 pastors each month.

Podcast
The monthly CLI podcast is offered as a free download to pastors and church leaders.

Blog
The Church Leader Insights blog is updated regularly with free information for pastors and church leaders.

Live events
CLI offers live seminars at locations throughout the United States, and CLI is again forwarding the use of technology in equipping church leaders by offering many of its trainings over the phone (teleseminars) and online via webinars.

Other resources
In addition to newsletters, podcasts, and live events, CLI offers resources for pastors in the following areas:
 Assimilation
 Church Planting
 Evangelism
 Growth Barriers
 Leadership
 Sermon Series
 Small Groups
 Stewardship
 Strategy
 Worship Planning

See also 
 Nelson Searcy

References

External links
Church Leader Insights website
Nelson Searcy's CLI blog

Evangelical parachurch organizations
Leadership training